"Tattoo" is a song by Swedish singer Loreen, released as a single on 25 February 2023. The song is set to represent Sweden in the Eurovision Song Contest 2023 after winning Melodifestivalen 2023, Sweden's national selection for that year's Eurovision Song Contest. Following its performance in its Melodifestivalen heat, the song debuted at number one on the Swedish singles chart.

Charts

References

2023 songs
2023 singles
Melodifestivalen songs of 2023
Number-one singles in Sweden
Songs written by Peter Boström
Songs written by Thomas G:son
Eurovision songs of 2023
Eurovision songs of Sweden